Armstrong Flooring is a Pennsylvania corporation incorporated in 2016. It was spun off as an independent entity from Armstrong World Industries in April 2016. The company manufactures flooring products in the US in 
Beech Creek, Pennsylvania; Jackson, Mississippi; Kankakee, Illinois; Lancaster, Pennsylvania; South Gate, California; and Stillwater, Oklahoma; and internationally in Shanghai, China and Braeside, Victoria.

On November 16, 2018, Armstrong Flooring announced it would be selling its wood-flooring business to American Industrial Partners, a private-equity firm, for $100 million.

Hazel Dell Brown, chief interior designer of Armstrong Flooring, introduced a number of influential and popular floor coverings and other interior designs.

In 2022, the company entered into Chapter 11 bankruptcy, and its stock was delisted from the New York Stock Exchange.

References

External links
 

Companies formerly listed on the New York Stock Exchange
Companies based in Lancaster, Pennsylvania
Building materials companies of the United States
Companies that filed for Chapter 11 bankruptcy in 2022